Bandy  has so far only been contested in one edition of the Asian Winter Games, namely the seventh Winter Games in 2011.

There was only a  bandy tournament for men. Three countries took part, Kazakhstan, Kyrgyzstan and Mongolia. Tajikistan had also planned to take part, but this did not happen.

Summary

Medal table

Participating nations

List of medalists

References

External links
2011 Asian Winter Games Official Website

 
Sports at the Asian Winter Games
Asia